The Chivunk is Brazilian fast attack vehicle used by paratroopers and special forces. with co-development of the VLEGA Gaucho ending in 2011.

Development
The Chivunk was preceded by a joint program by Argentina and Brazil as the VLEGA Gaucho until 2011.

Design
The Chivunk uses diamond plate surfacing and a built-in roll cage for field ruggedness and durability. It has multipurpose roles such as transport, medevac, reconnaissance and can be air dropped by parachute. Around 2-4 vehicles can be air transported in a C-130 Hercules and 4-7 vehicles in an Embraer C-390. Chivunk vehicles can be stored by stacking above each other. It can also be armed with a 120mm Mortar, AT4 launcher and FN MAG 7.62mm GPMG.

See also
 FMC XR311
 VLEGA Gaucho
 P6 ATAV
 Agrale Marrua

References

External links
Viatura Leve de Emprego Geral Aerotransportável (VLEGA CHIVUNK)
Columbus
40 viaturas Vlega Chivunk para o Exército Brasileiro em 2018
Chivunk 4x4

Military light utility vehicles
Military equipment of Brazil